United States v. Keenan was a court case in the United States where the accused, US Marine PFC Charles W. Keenan, was found guilty of murder after he shot and killed a Vietnamese man under orders from a superior officer. The Court of Military Appeals held that following orders was not a justification if "the order was of such a nature that a man of ordinary sense and understanding would know it to be illegal". The soldier who gave Keenan the order, US Marine Corporal Stanley Luczko, was convicted of killing another Vietnamese person during the same incident.

See also 
 Nuremberg Defense

References 

United States military case law
Law articles needing an infobox